Tigrioides sabulosalis is a moth in the family Erebidae. It was described by Francis Walker in 1866. It is found in India, Sri Lanka, Myanmar and on Peninsular Malaysia, Sumatra and Borneo.

References

Moths described in 1866
Lithosiina